Nacra Sailing is a Dutch company that manufactures a line of small catamaran sailboats, or beachcats. NACRA was founded in 1975 to tap into the market created by Hobie Alter the founder of Hobie Cat, and several other companies offering small fiberglass catamarans designed to be sailed off the beach by a crew of one or two.

NACRA is an acronym that stands for North American Catamaran Racing Association, and as the name implies, the company has remained primarily focused on racing catamarans from inception.

History

Nacra Sailing was founded by sailboat designer Tom Roland who had previously designed the Alpha Cat, an 18-foot beach cat, in 1970. After this he designed a 36 foot, oversized one design beach catamaran as part of venture to start a professional sailboat racing series. About 10 of these were built, but the racing series didn't turn out to be viable.  The racing series was the original source of the NACRA acronym (North American Catamaran Racing Association), which was carried over when he decided to build a scaled down and more commercial version of his big one-design racer. 

In 1975 he launched the new company with the Nacra 5.2, a 17-foot beach cat, which was an unusual design that featured plumb bows, daggerboards, and a highly tunable sail plan with a fully battened loose-footed main sail.  Many of the design elements of this first boat were carried over to the later designs as well as becoming common on other performance oriented catamarans.

The company has gone through several ownership and name changes over the years, and acquired the competing Prindle brand in 1988.  At that time the company operated under the name "Performance Catamarans"  and relocated from Santa Barbara to Santa Ana, California.  In 2007 the company was acquired by a group in the Netherlands and today operates as Nacra Sailing. An Australian-based licensee of Nacra Sailing has operated as NACRA Australasia since 1985 and also builds NACRA branded boats.

Nacra Sailing's 20 foot boats dominated the Worrell 1000, a race the New York Times described as "A Tour d'France on the Water", throughout the 1990s, and were selected as only the second one-design for the race in 2001.

In 2012 Nacra Sailing won the design competition held by World Sailing, the world governing body for the sport of sailing recognized by the International Olympic Committee and the International Paralympic Committee, for a new Olympic racing catamaran, the Nacra 17, which was used in the new for 2016 Olympic Mixed Multihull class, which requires one male and one female sailor per boat. In 2017 it was announced that a modified version of the boat with foiling capability will be used in the Tokyo 2020 Olympics.

In 2015 the Nacra 15 was adopted by World Sailing as a Youth World Championships class, as well as a new class for the Youth Olympic Games. In 2016 British RYA selected the Nacra 15 as their new Youth Multihull boat, as well.

Recent catamarans built by Nacra Sailing have included rudders and daggerboards shaped to facilitate hydofoiling at higher speeds, among the first commercial sail boats to offer this feature.

Current and notable past models

See also
 List of multihulls

References

External links

 Nacra Sailing - Official website

 Nacra Association of Australia - racing class association
 Nacra 15 Class - racing class association
 Nacra 17 Class - racing class association
 Formula 16 - racing class association
 F18 International Class Association - racing class association

 Nacra North America - North American distributor
 Nacra Australasia - Australian distributor & manufacturer of some models

Nacra Sailing